The Defence Survive, Evade, Resist, Extract (SERE) Training Organisation (DSTO), is a military training organisation based at RAF St Mawgan, Cornwall, in the United Kingdom. It is tri-service and trains personnel in survival techniques, evading capture and resistance from interrogation.

History

Background 
The Royal Navy and the Royal Air Force have what has been described as a "rich history of survival training". Crews were often lost at sea during the Second World War, with an attrition rate of 80%, which prompted this training to be initiated.

Prior to the DSTO being established, the Royal Navy and RAF provided their own survival training and the Resistance Training Wing provided the services with conduct after capture training.

Royal Navy 
Before 1943, Royal Navy survival training and equipment was the responsibility of two ratings trained by the RAF. The significance of the work however resulted in a reorganisation whereby the navy would train its own Survival Equipment Officers and ratings. The new Royal Navy Survival Equipment School (RNSES) initially took up residence at Eastleigh in Hampshire before moving to improved accommodation at Grange Airfield (HMS Siskin) in March 1947. In 1955, the school moved to a former boy’s preparatory school (Seafield Park) at Hill Head. It remained at Hill Head until September 1991 when it relocated to the former Naval Aircraft Technical Evaluation Centre (NATEC) building at RNAS Lee-on-Solent (HMS Daedalus). In February 1995, the RNSES become part of the Royal Navy Air Engineering School which was renamed Royal Navy Air Engineering and Survival School (RNAESS). The unit was renamed the Survival Equipment Group and formed part of the Air Engineering and Survival Department, remaining at HMS Sultan until 2008.

Resistance Training Wing 
Formerly 4 Conduct after Capture Company (4 CAC Coy), the Resistance Training Wing (RTW) was part of the now disbanded Joint Services Intelligence Organisation (JSIO) based at Defence Intelligence Security Centre Chicksands in Bedfordshire. The wing trained personnel resistance to interrogation techniques.

Royal Air Force 
The Royal Air Force can trace such training back to May 1943 with the formation of the School of Air/Sea Rescue, located near RAF Squire Gate in Lancashire. The school taught RAF and USAAF crews rescue procedures and familiarisation with rescue equipment. It relocated to RAF Calshot in Hampshire in 1945, when it became the Survival and Rescue Training Unit, before moving to RAF Thorney Island in West Sussex during 1946. It disbanded in April 1949, but was replaced by the Survival and Rescue Mobile Instruction Unit (SRMIU), again at Thorney Island, in January 1950. The SRMIU would provide training to personnel during annual visits to RAF stations, however this method was considered inadequate and in 1955 the Search, Rescue and Survival School was established as part of No. 2 Air Navigation School. The School moved to RAF Mount Batten near Plymouth In June 1959. At that time it was renamed the School of Combat Survival and Rescue (SCSR), reflecting the combat environment which it was expected that survival and rescue skills would typically be used. RAF Mount Batten closed in 1992, with the school relocated to RAF St Mawgan in Cornwall, where it remained until 2008.

Establishment 
The Defence Survive, Evade, Resist, Extract (SERE) Training Organisation (DSTO) was created in 2008, when the RAF's School of Combat Survival and Rescue was amalgamated with the Royal Navy's Survival Equipment Group and the Resistance Training Wing. Although DSTO is a tri-service organisation, it comes under the control of No. 22 Group within RAF Air Command.

The Royal Air Force is the lead on aircrew-focused training for military personnel in the United Kingdom and their second training centre (ASTC) is located at RAF Cranwell in Lincolnshire. The patron of ASTC is Ray Mears, who himself was in a SERE situation whilst filming in 2005 when his helicopter crashed in Wyoming. Mears managed to recover all of his crew to safety after the incident.

Role and operations 

SERE is an acronym for Survive, Evade, Resist and Extract. At a basic level, this is a core aspect of training for all UK military personnel on an annual basis. Regular Army personnel are tested as part of their Military Annual Training Tests (MATTs) as befits their frontline nature (similar processes are run by the Royal Marines and RAF Regiment) with non-frontline personnel mandated to watch a DVD detailing SERE methods.

UK armed forces personnel who train at the SERE school may be subject to methods of interrogation that are prohibited under international law. This training is carried out under strictly controlled conditions and is only delivered to enable the trainees to understand the methods that may be used against them if they are captured by hostile forces who are not signatories to, or adherents of, the Geneva Convention or of international law.

SERE is mandated for all aircrew from all services and involves sea drills for those that require it. Sea drills involve jumping into the sea and spending some time adrift before hauling oneself into a dinghy, from where the servicemember can be rescued. The Royal Navy and Royal Air Force aircrews practice this with regularity. SERE training is also delivered to aircrew because the nature of their job makes them vulnerable to capture if they have to bail out over or crash an aircraft into hostile territory.

Notable students
 Prince William, Duke of Cambridge – went through the training as part of his survival training for being a helicopter pilot
 Prince Harry, Duke of Sussex – went through the training as part of his survival training for being a helicopter pilot
 Richard Branson – underwent the survival training as part of his world record ballooning attempt
 Guy Martin – trained at St Mawgan for his pedal-powered blimp challenge across the English Channel
 Carol Vorderman – undertook sea drills SERE training at RAF St Mawgan as part of her effort to become the ninth woman to fly solo around the world.

See also
 United Kingdom Special Forces Selection
 Survival, Evasion, Resistance and Escapean analogous program in the United States armed forces

References

Military education and training in the United Kingdom
Psychological warfare
Survival training
2008 establishments in the United Kingdom